Gilfach Goch Rugby Football Club is a rugby union team from the village of Gilfach Goch, South Wales. Gilfach Goch RFC was established in 1889, has been a member of the Welsh Rugby Union since 1956 and is a feeder club for the Cardiff Blues.

The clubhouse, in High Street Gilfach Goch, has been the club's base for the past 40 years. Gilfach Goch RFC is a community club, and has over 170 players currently involved in teams run by the club. These roots are continually developing, especially with the development of the Junior section of the club. The club currently runs the following teams :- 1st XV, 2nd XV, Youth XV and many mini rugby teams from Under 8's up to Youth age.

Club honours
 1996/97 WRU Division Six Central - Champions
 1996/97 Glamorgan County Silver Ball Trophy - Winners 
 1997/98 Glamorgan County Silver Ball Trophy - Winners
 2003/04 WRU Division Three South East - Champions
 2007/08 WRU Division Three South East - Play Off Winners
 2009/10 WRU Division Two East - Champions

Notable former players 
The following players have represented Gilfach Goch and been capped at international level.
  Ian Hall
 Mathew Back
  Jason Lewis
  Andrew Williams (Rugby League Cap)

References

Welsh rugby union teams
1889 establishments in Wales
Rugby clubs established in 1889
Sport in Rhondda Cynon Taf